Erica Cornejo (born 1978/79) is an Argentine ballet dancer who was a principal dancer with the Boston Ballet.

Early life
Cornejo was born in San Luis, Argentina and raised in Buenos Aires. Her younger brother, Herman Cornejo, is currently a principal dancer with the American Ballet Theatre. She started ballet at age four, and later trained at the Colon Theater Superior Institute of Art.

Career
In 1994, she joined Julio Bocca's touring troupe, Ballet Argentino, where she became a principal ballerina and one of Bocca's dance partners. In 1998, when the company was performing in New York, the Cornejos siblings performed a tango titled El Chamuyo, and took classes with the American Ballet Theatre. After that, the two were invited to join the Studio Company. She became a member of the corps de ballet the same year and was promoted to soloist in 2003. She left ABT in 2006 to join the Boston Ballet as a principal dancer. She retired from the company in 2017. In 2019, to celebrate Herman Cornejo's 20th anniversary with ABT, Erica returned to ABT to dance El Chamuyo.

Cornejo opened a dance studio in Boston called Integrarte with her husband and former Boston Ballet principal dancer Carlos Molina.

Personal life
Cornejo is married to Carlos Molina, a fellow Boston Ballet principal dancer, whom she met in ABT. They have a child.

References

Living people
1970s births
People from Buenos Aires
Argentine ballerinas
Boston Ballet principal dancers
American Ballet Theatre soloists
Argentine expatriates in the United States
21st-century ballet dancers
21st-century Argentine dancers